This is chronology of Gambela city, the capital of Gambela Region of Ethiopia.
 15 May 1902 – Emperor Menelik II granted Britain use of port along with Baro River.
 1911–1917 – Over 70% of external trade of Ethiopia came through Djibouti, though trade rate was the fastest in Gambela until Italian conquest.
 1907 – the port and custom station were founded at Gambela.
 9 July 1927 – Regent Ras Tafari later Emperor Haile Selassie granted concessions to T Zervos and A. Danalis to construct a road 180 kilometers in length to connect Gambela with the town of Metu and Gore.
 Mid-1930 – According to Richard Pankhurst, boats sailed twice in month during the rainy season, taking seven days downstream and eleven upstream.
 14 October 1936 – the shipping service suspended and the steamer, together with the British resident, left Gambela.
 3 February 1941 – the Italian by the 2/6 King's African Rifles took Gambela.
 May 1941 – Lij Tewedros, son of Lij Iyasu, surfaced in Gambela area and proclaimed himself Emperor. His insurrection was prevented by Belgian Congo troops before they left the area in February 1942.
 19 December 1944 – Anglo-Ethiopian Agreement left Gambela enclave region.
 15 October 1956 – after several years held as enclave by Sudanese government when they achieved independence, Gambela handed over to Ethiopia.
 27 May 1991 – Gambela was captured by the Ethiopian People's Revolutionary Democratic Front (EPRDF).
 13 December 2003 – Gambela massacre took place in which 30 Ethiopian highlander civilians killed Anuak population.
 12 March 2012 – 2012 Gambella bus attack killed 19 people on board being shot dead.

References

Gambela Region